Ruslan Albertovich Zakharov (born 24 March 1987) is a Russian athlete in short track and speed skater.

Career
Zakharov competed at the 2010 Winter Olympics for Russia. In the 500 metres and 1000 metres, he placed fourth in his round one heat, failing to advance, and in the 1500 metres, he placed sixth, also failing to advance. His best overall finish was in the 500, where he placed 27th.

As of 2013, Zakharov's best performance at the World Championships came in 2008, when placed 8th in the 1500 metres. He also won a gold medal as a member of the Russian relay team at the 2013 European Championships, and placed 3rd in the overall competition at the 2011 European Championships.

As of 2013, Zakharov has four ISU Short Track Speed Skating World Cup podium finishes, all as part of the 5000m relay team. His best finishes are silver medals in 2012–13 at Calgary and in 2013–14 at Torino and Kolomna. His top World Cup ranking is 10th, in the 1500 metres in 2012–13.

World Cup podiums

Short track

Long track

Overall rankings

References

External links

1987 births
Living people
Russian male short track speed skaters
Short track speed skaters at the 2010 Winter Olympics
Short track speed skaters at the 2014 Winter Olympics
Speed skaters at the 2022 Winter Olympics
Olympic silver medalists for the Russian Olympic Committee athletes
Olympic medalists in short track speed skating
Olympic short track speed skaters of Russia
Olympic speed skaters of Russia
Olympic gold medalists for Russia
Olympic medalists in speed skating
Medalists at the 2014 Winter Olympics
Medalists at the 2022 Winter Olympics
Universiade medalists in short track speed skating
Russian male speed skaters
Oath takers at the Olympic Games
Universiade bronze medalists for Russia
Competitors at the 2009 Winter Universiade
World Single Distances Speed Skating Championships medalists
Sportspeople from Nizhny Novgorod